The 1989–90 Auburn Tigers men's basketball team represented Auburn University in the 1989–90 college basketball season. The team's head coach was Tommy Joe Eagles, who was in his first season at Auburn. The team played their home games at Joel H. Eaves Memorial Coliseum in Auburn, Alabama. They finished the season 13–18, 8–10 in SEC play, good for seventh in the conference. They defeated LSU to advance to the semifinals of the SEC tournament where they lost to Alabama.

The team lost center Matt Geiger, who transferred to Georgia Tech.

Forward John Caylor returned from the previous season's blood clot issue with another season of eligibility and a solid season, playing in 28 of 31 games and averaging 8.7 points and 6.8 rebounds.

Roster

References

Auburn Tigers men's basketball seasons
Auburn
Auburn Tigers
Auburn Tigers